Juan Ruiz de Villarán (died 18 March 1591) was a Roman Catholic prelate who served as Bishop of Lugo (1587–1591).

Biography
On 22 June 1587, Juan Ruiz de Villarán was appointed during the papacy of Pope Sixtus V as Bishop of Lugo. He served as Bishop of Lugo until his death on 18 March 1591.

References

External links and additional sources
 (for Chronology of Bishops) 
 (for Chronology of Bishops) 

1591 deaths
16th-century Roman Catholic bishops in Spain
Bishops appointed by Pope Sixtus V